Ballistic transistor may mean:

 Ballistic deflection transistor
 Ballistic collection transistor
 any transistor featuring ballistic conduction